Fengler is a surname. Notable people with the surname include:

 Harlan Fengler (1903–1981), American racecar driver
 Michael Fengler (born 1940), German film producer
 Stefan Fengler (born 1968), German footballer